Prince Panduvasudeva, (died 474 BC) was King of Upatissa Nuwara (in modern-day Sri Lanka) from 504 BC to 474 BC. He was the first monarch of the Kingdom of Upatissa Nuwara and succeeded Upatissa, who reigned as regent. Panduvasudeva had ten sons, including Abhaya and Tissa and one daughter, Unmada Chitra. He was a nephew of Prince Vijaya.

Arrival on Sri Lanka 
Since Prince Panduvasudeva learned that King Vijaya had requested that someone from the royal family be present in Sri Lanka to carry on the royal bloodline, he offered to travel. He and 32 ministers disguised themselves as Buddhist monks and traveled from Sinhapura to a port on the Mahakanadara River's mouth. The people of Upatissa Nuwara welcomed him and gave him the throne of the kingdom but he was not consecrated  since he did not have a consort.

Ancestors

External links
 History of Sri Lankan Kings
 Codrington's Short History of Ceylon

474 BC deaths
Year of birth unknown
Monarch of Tambapanni
Sinhalese kings
House of Vijaya
6th-century BC Sinhalese monarchs
5th-century BC Sinhalese monarchs